The flag of Cambodia in its present form was originally adopted in 1948 and readopted in 1993, after the Constituent Assembly election in 1993 and restoration of the Cambodian monarchy.

Description
Since around 1850, the Cambodian flag has featured a depiction of Angkor Wat in the centre. The current flag, with a blue border and red central (the stripes are in the ratio 1:2:1) was adopted following Cambodia's independence in 1948. It was used until 9 October 1970, when a new flag was introduced for Lon Nol's Khmer Republic that lasted until the takeover of the Khmer Rouge in 1975. The subsequent state of Democratic Kampuchea, which existed from 1975 to 1979, used a red flag with a three-towered Angkor Wat design retained in yellow beginning in 1976. The People's Republic of Kampuchea was established in 1979, after the Vietnamese invasion of Cambodia.

The Kampuchean National United Front for National Salvation (FUNSK) revived the flag adopted by the Khmer Issarak in the days of anti-French resistance for the new state. This flag had the same colour pattern as the DK flag, but with a yellow five-towered Angkor Wat silhouette. When the PRK renamed itself as "State of Cambodia" (SOC) in 1989, the flag's lower half became blue. The UNTAC flag was used during the 1992–1993 transitional period along with the flag of the SOC within Cambodia.

In 1993, the 1948 Cambodian flag was readopted. The current Cambodian flag, together with the flags of Portugal, San Marino and Spain, are the only four state flags to feature a building. Red and blue are traditional colours of Cambodia.

The flag used today is the same as that established in 1948, although the older flag is sometimes said to have used a red outline for Angkor Wat while the current flag uses black specifically. Since that time, five other intervening designs have been used. Almost all made use of the image of the temple of Angkor Wat in one form or another. This famous temple site, which dates from the 12th century, was built by the Mahidharapura monarchs. It has five towers, but these were not always all depicted in the stylised version used on flags. The monarchy was restored in September 1993, the 1948 flag having been readopted in June of that year.

Symbolism

Royal standard

The Royal Standard of the King of Cambodia ("King's Flag") is the personal flag of the Cambodian monarch. It was officially adopted in 1993, but its initial use dates back to 1941. It is also considered among the national symbols of Cambodia.

Historical national flags

See also
 List of Cambodian flags

References

External links
 

Flags of Cambodia
Flag
National flags
Cambodia
Cambodia